Loka is a settlement in the Municipality of Starše in the Styria region of Slovenia.

References

External links
Loka on Geopedia

Populated places in the Municipality of Starše